Harihar fort / Harshagad is a fort located 40 km from Nashik City, 48 km from Igatpuri, 40 km from Ghoti in Nashik district, of Maharashtra, India. It is an important fort in Nashik district, and was constructed to look upon the trade route through Gonda Ghat. It receives many visitors because of its peculiar rock-cut steps.

History
Harihar fort was built during the Seuna (Yadava) dynasty period. It was surrendered to Khan Zamam in 1636 along with Trymbak and other Pune forts. The fort was captured by Captain Briggs in 1818 along with 17 other forts.

Access
There are two base villages of the fort, Harshewadi and Nirgudpada. The Harshewadi is 13 km from Trymbakeshwar. The other base village of the fort is Nirgudpada/Kotamvadi which is 40 km from Ghoti which itself is 48 km from Nashik and 121 km from Mumbai. One can travel from Ghoti to Trimbakeshwar by bus or by private vehicle. One should take care of returning from the fort the last bus from Trimbakeshwar is 5:30pm to Ghoti and enough trains are available from Nashik to Mumbai till late night. The climb from Harshewadi is easier than from the Nirgudpada. A wide, safe trekking path starts from the hil
lock north of the Nirgudpada. It passes through scrub forest till it reaches an open ridge which is connected to the fort. It takes about an hour to reach the scarp of the hill on which the fort is situated. The ascent through the 60 m rock-cut steps is wonderful. It is like a stone ladder placed at 60 degrees along the scarp. The steps are worn out in many places yet the holes on either side of the steps are conveniently cut for holding onto. After reaching the main entrance, the path takes a left traverse and again helical rock cut steps are to be climbed, which are more steep than the earlier. The steps finally end with a narrow entrance. At many places the steps are so narrow that, only a single person can climb at a time. Accommodation is possible on the Harihar Fort, as well as in the local villages.

Features
There are no good structures left on the fort except for a storage house with a small entrance. There is a series of rock-cut water cisterns in the centre of the fort. It takes about an hour to visit all places on the fort.

See also 

 List of forts in Maharashtra
 List of forts in India
 Marathi People
 Military history of India
 List of people involved in the Maratha Empire

References 

Buildings and structures of the Maratha Empire
Forts in Nashik district
16th-century forts in India